The 2001 Western Australian state election was held on 10 February 2001.

Retiring Members

Labor
 Ted Cunningham MLA (Girrawheen)
 Julian Grill MLA (Eyre)
 Bill Thomas MLA (Cockburn)
 Diana Warnock MLA (Perth)
 Cheryl Davenport MLC (South Metropolitan)
 Bob Thomas MLC (South West)

Liberal
 Kevin Minson MLA (Greenough)
 George Strickland MLA (Innaloo)
 Max Evans MLC (North Metropolitan)
 Muriel Patterson MLC (South West)

National
 Bob Wiese MLA (Wagin)
 Murray Montgomery MLC (South West)

Independent
 Ernie Bridge MLA (Kimberley)

Legislative Assembly
Sitting members are shown in bold text. Successful candidates are highlighted in the relevant colour. Where there is possible confusion, an asterisk (*) is also used. Note that liberals for forests, while an organised group, was not in fact registered as a political party by the Western Australian Electoral Commission.

Legislative Council
Sitting members are shown in bold text. Tickets that elected at least one MLC are highlighted in the relevant colour. Successful candidates are identified by an asterisk (*).

Agricultural
Five seats were up for election. The Labor Party was defending one seat. The Liberal Party was defending two seats. The National Party was defending two seats.

East Metropolitan
Five seats were up for election. The Labor Party was defending two seats. The Liberal Party was defending two seats. The Australian Democrats were defending one seat.

Mining and Pastoral
Five seats were up for election. The Labor Party was defending three seats. The Liberal Party was defending two seats.

North Metropolitan
Seven seats were up for election. The Labor Party was defending two seats. The Liberal Party was defending three seats. The Australian Democrats were defending one seat. The Greens WA were defending one seat.

South Metropolitan
Five seats were up for election. The Labor Party was defending two seats. The Liberal Party was defending two seats. The Greens WA were defending one seat.

South West
Seven seats were up for election. The Labor Party was defending two seats. The Liberal Party was defending three seats. The National Party was defending one seat. The Greens WA were defending one seat.

See also
 Members of the Western Australian Legislative Assembly, 1996–2001
 Members of the Western Australian Legislative Assembly, 2001–2005
 Members of the Western Australian Legislative Council, 1997–2001
 Members of the Western Australian Legislative Council, 2001–2005
 2001 Western Australian state election

References
Voting by District - Psephos, Adam Carr's Election Archive
Voting by Region - Psephos, Adam Carr's Election Archive

Candidates for Western Australian state elections